Javanese French Guianans are an ethnic group of French Guianans who are full or partial Javanese descent. There are approximately 3,000 Javanese French Guianans lives in interior part of French Guiana.

Javanese French Guianans speak Caribbean Javanese and no longer speak Indonesian fluently.

See also
Javanese people

References

Javanese people
Ethnic groups in French Guiana
F
F
F